Ponomaryovskaya is a rural locality (a village) and the administrative center of Tavrengskoye Rural Settlement, Konoshsky District, Arkhangelsk Oblast, Russia. The population was 368 as of 2010. There are 9 streets.

Geography 
Ponomaryovskaya is located 48 km southeast of Konosha (the district's administrative centre) by road. Pogarinskaya is the nearest rural locality.

References 

Rural localities in Konoshsky District
Velsky Uyezd